Shirley Pérez Figueroa (born 16 July 1979) is a Bolivian retired footballer who played as a forward. She has been a member of the Bolivia women's national team.

International career
Pérez played for Bolivia at senior level in three Copa América Femenina editions (2003, 2010 and 2014).

International goals
Scores and results list Bolivia's goal tally first

References

1979 births
Living people
Women's association football forwards
Bolivian women's footballers
Bolivia women's international footballers
Club Aurora players